Tyson Andrews (born 6 February 1990) is an Australian professional rugby league footballer.

Background
Born in Maitland, New South Wales, Andrews is of Indigenous Australian descent and moved to Queensland at a young age. He played his junior rugby league for the Maroochydore Swans, before being signed by the Brisbane Broncos.

Playing career
In 2008 and 2009, Andrews played for the Brisbane Broncos' NYC team.

In 2010, Andrews quit rugby league and pursued boxing. He won the Australian heavyweight amateur title.

In 2011, Andrews moved to Mackay, Queensland to play for Wests, a local team. He was then brought into the squad of Queensland Cup team Mackay Cutters after impressing their coaching staff.

In June 2013, Andrews signed a 2-year contract with the Manly Warringah Sea Eagles starting in 2014.

In Round 18 of the 2014 NRL season, Andrews made his NRL debut for the Sea Eagles against the Wests Tigers.

On 13 February 2015, Andrews played for the Indigenous All Stars against the NRL All Stars in the annual All Stars match.

References

External links
2014 Manly Warringah Sea Eagles profile

1990 births
Living people
Australian rugby league players
Indigenous Australian rugby league players
Indigenous All Stars players
Manly Warringah Sea Eagles players
Mackay Cutters players
Rugby league props
Rugby league players from Maitland, New South Wales